The Middle Fork Coquille River is a tributary, about  long, of the South Fork Coquille River in the U.S. state of Oregon. It begins near Camas Mountain in Douglas County in the Southern Oregon Coast Range. It flows generally south, bypassing the community of Camas Valley while passing through the valley of the same name, then curves west and north to Remote in Coos County. The Middle Fork then flows generally west, passes by the small community of Bridge, and meets the South Fork near Myrtle Point.

Oregon Route 42 runs along the river from Camas Valley to the mouth. The land in the watershed is used mainly for timber production and farming; commercial forests dominate much of the region.

Tributaries
Named tributaries of the Middle Fork Coquille River from source to mouth are Estes, Lake, Cole, Lang, Wildcat, Bar, Reed, and Jim Bilieu creeks. Then come Day, Mill, Bingham, Mystic, Twelvemile, Bear, and Slater creeks followed by Panther Creek and another Lake Creek.

Further downstream are Upper Rock, Slide, Sandy, Frenchie and Tanner creeks. Then come Belieu, Myrtle, Salmon, Big, King, McMullen, Endicott, and Indian creeks and another Mill Creek.

Fishing
The Middle Fork supports populations of wild cutthroat trout as well as small runs of salmon and steelhead. Fishing for cutthroat is catch and release. The river is closed to fishing between mid-September and the end of November to protect spawning salmon.

See also
 List of rivers of Oregon

References

External links
Coquille Watershed Association

Rivers of Coos County, Oregon
Rivers of Douglas County, Oregon
Rivers of Oregon